Xylotrechus annobonae is a species of longhorn beetles in the family Cerambycidae. The species is endemic to the island of Annobón in Equatorial Guinea. The species was named by Christopher Aurivillius in 1910.

References

Xylotrechus
Endemic fauna of Annobón
Invertebrates of Equatorial Guinea
Beetles described in 1910